Results for the 2007 Victorian Football League known as the TRUenergy VFL season.

TRUenergy VFL season

Round 2 - Seniors

Round 3 - Seniors

Round 4 - Seniors

Round 5 - Seniors

Round 6 - Seniors

Round 7 - Seniors

VFL Representative Match

Round 8 - Seniors

Round 9 - Seniors

Round 10 - Seniors

Round 11 - Seniors

Round 12 - Seniors

Round 13 - Seniors

Round 14 - Seniors

Round 15 - Seniors

Round 16 - Seniors

Round 17 - Seniors

Round 18 - Seniors

Round 19 - Seniors

Round 20 - Seniors

Vfl Season Results, 2007
Victorian Football League seasons